Florida City is a city in Miami-Dade County, Florida, United States. It is the southernmost municipality in the South Florida metropolitan area. Florida City is primarily a Miami suburb and a major agricultural area. As of the 2020 census, it had a population of 13,085, up from 11,245 in 2010.

The city lies to the south and west of, and is contiguous with, Homestead. Both cities suffered catastrophic damage in August 1992 when Hurricane Andrew struck South Florida.

The city originated as a land promotion named "Detroit". There were no buildings in the area when the first thirty families arrived in 1910, and they had to stay in Homestead until their houses could be built. The name was changed to "Florida City" when the town incorporated in 1914. It has a small historic area, but much of the city is hotels and other tourist facilities.

The city is at the eastern end of the only road running through the Everglades National Park, which terminates at Flamingo. Florida City is the southernmost city in the United States which is not on an island. It is also the last stop on the mainland north of the Florida Keys. The southern terminus of the Homestead Extension of Florida's Turnpike where it ends at its junction with U.S. 1 is located in Florida City. Homestead is immediately north and east of Florida City, and these two cities comprise the greater Homestead-Florida City area. Some of the notable unincorporated communities in the area are Redland, Leisure City, Naranja, and Princeton.

Physiography and natural history
Florida City is situated mostly atop a limestone ridge called the Miami Rock Ridge that extends south from present day North Miami Beach to a location in Everglades National Park. The ridge, consisting of Miami limestone, serves as the higher ground within the community. The ridge extended from northeast to southwest across the city. The old location of the Florida East Coast Railway track marks the approximate boundary of the location of the limestone ridge south of Davis Parkway. The range of elevation of the ridge is from 5 to 8 feet (1.5–2.4 meters) above sea level.

Before settlement, the ridge was vegetated by South Florida Slash Pine trees, which were alternatively known as Dade County Pine (Pinus elliottii var. densa). (Remnants of these pines can be seen today in local parks and in Everglades National Park at the Long Pine Key picnic area.) These pine rocklands were crushed by equipment and converted to farmland during the 1900s. Tomatoes, squash, and other truck crops were grown in the area during the winter months and packed at the Florida City State Farmers' Market near Krome Avenue and Palm Drive, driving the local economy throughout the 1900s.

East of the natural ridge was a broad area of marshlands surrounding the area. Old timers of Florida City called these coastal glades the "East Glade". This was an extension of Everglades that extended from areas west and south of Florida City to its east. East of the East Glade, marshlands gave way to mangrove swamp prior to reaching Biscayne Bay. Soils in the East Glade primarily consisted of a limey soil called Biscayne Marl.

Development schemes in the East Glade led to the construction of canals in the early 1900s. This led to a lowering of water tables. Although development the East Glade was not extensive prior to the 1980s, agricultural development did occur. Potatoes were the primary crop grown in the East Glade before the construction of extensive housing developments within the areas annexed by the City of Homestead in the late 1970s. Potatoes mostly were harvested from February to March.

Florida City was historically bisected by a slough. Sloughs commonly were found crossing the limestone ridge at a roughly perpendicular angle from Miami to Florida City. Florida City's slough (officially called "Long Slough" or "Long Glade Slough") entered the city near Redland Road and Lucy Street, and extended across the city to the southeast to a location near today's NW 3rd Street and NW 3rd Avenue. East of this point, the slough entered the East Glade.

Long Slough was a slow flowing body of water that originated in the Everglades just south of the Miami Homestead General Aviation Airport. As canals were constructed in the 1900s, and especially the 1960s, the slough was drained and became a low valley in the limestone ridge. Roadways (such as Redland Road near West Homestead Elementary School, NW 6th Avenue north of Davis Parkway, and NW 3rd Avenue about fifty feet north of NW 3rd Street) had culverts constructed under them to allow water to pass through the slough. NW 4th Street east of NW 5th Avenue dead ended near the approximate location where a fictional NW 4th Avenue would intersect that street. During the late 1980s, the street was constructed to reach NW 3rd Avenue since water in the slough had been drained away. Eventually fill was added to the slough and it was destroyed.

Extensive filling operations were conducted in Long Slough near NW 3rd Avenue in the late 1970s. Fill was obtained as waste rock from a nearby rock cutting operation (utilizing Key Largo Limestone, a local coral rock) and was allowed to be dumped in the location by the landowners. Today, this portion of Long Slough serves as a housing development.

An additional natural feature existed along Davis Parkway, extending into the Florida City Camper Park. This feature was a live oak hammock. The understory of the hammock was cleared for the camper park, but much of the hammock remained undisturbed to the south of Davis Parkway and NW 1st Road before the late 1970s.

Florida City today serves as the southern terminus of the Homestead Extension of Florida's Turnpike. Motels and eateries are located along US 1 before taking the highway south into the Florida Keys. Along with serving as the mainland entrance to the Florida Keys, Florida City also serves as the gateway to the main section of Everglades National Park.

Geography

Demographics

2020 census

As of the 2020 United States census, there were 13,085 people, 2,860 households, and 2,278 families residing in the city.

2010 census

As of 2010, there were 3,792 households, out of which 12.3% were vacant. In 2000, 46.5% had children under the age of 18 living with them, 35.6% were married couples living together, 34.0% had a female householder with no husband present, and 23.1% were non-families. 18.1% of all households were made up of individuals, and 6.7% had someone living alone who was 65 years of age or older. The average household size was 3.48 and the average family size was 3.95.

2000 census
In 2000, the city population was spread out, with 39.7% under the age of 18, 11.0% from 18 to 24, 26.3% from 25 to 44, 15.8% from 45 to 64, and 7.2% who were 65 years of age or older. The median age was 24 years. For every 100 females, there were 94.7 males. For every 100 females age 18 and over, there were 89.7 males.

In 2000, the median income for a household in the city was $14,923, and the median income for a family was $18,777. Males had a median income of $23,622 versus $20,060 for females. The per capita income for the city was $8,270. 43.3% of the population and 41.7% of families were below the poverty line. 57.1% of those under the age of 18 and 25.6% of those 65 and older were living below the poverty line.

As of 2000, English was spoken as a first language by 65.64% of the population; Spanish speakers made up 28.33% of all residents, and French Creole was spoken by 6.03% of the populace.

Based on 2010 data, the ancestries of only the Hispanic and Latino population from highest to lowest were as follows: Mexicans made up the 42.52%, Cubans were at 19.13%, Central Americans accounted for 13.37%, Puerto Ricans totaled 12.87%, and South Americans were 3.74% of all residents.

Crime
As of 2020, Florida City was rated as the #1 "most dangerous" city in the state of Florida. Within a population of 11,826, it had a violent crime rate of 2,908.8 per 100,000. The poverty rate of the city was listed at 14%.

Government and infrastructure
The Florida Department of Corrections operates the Dade Correctional Institution and the Homestead Correctional Institution in an unincorporated area near Florida City. The Dade CI was originally the Dade Correctional Institution Annex, and the Homestead CI was originally the Dade Correctional Institution; the two received their current names on July 1, 2003.

The United States Postal Service operates the Florida City Post Office.

Education
Florida City is a part of the Miami-Dade County Public Schools system.

Florida City is zoned to:
 Florida City Elementary School (Florida City)
 Homestead Middle School (Homestead)
 Homestead High School (Homestead)

In addition Rise Academy-South Dade Charter School is in the area.

Florida City also has the following Charter Schools:
 Lawrence Academy Charter
 Lincoln Marti International Campus
 Miami Community Charter

Climate
The Köppen Climate Classification sub-type for this climate is "Aw". (Tropical Savanna Climate) with long, hot summers and short, warm winters.

Notable people
 James Burgess, American football player
 Rashad Smith, American football player
 Sean Taylor, American Football Player

References

External links

 
 Florida City Elementary School

 
Cities in Miami-Dade County, Florida
Populated places established in 1914
Cities in Florida
Cities in Miami metropolitan area
1914 establishments in Florida